The Wild Rice River is a tributary of the Red River of the North in northwestern Minnesota in the United States. Via the Red River, Lake Winnipeg and the Nelson River, it is part of the watershed of Hudson Bay. It is one of two Red River tributaries with the same name, the other being the Wild Rice River of North Dakota.

Wild Rice River is an English translation of the native Ojibwe language name.

Course
The Wild Rice flows from Mud Lake in Clearwater County and follows a generally westwardly course through Mahnomen and Norman counties, through the White Earth Indian Reservation and past the towns of Mahnomen, Twin Valley and Hendrum, and just south of Ada, where the nearby headwaters of the Marsh River sometimes act as a distributary to the Red River during periods of high water.  In its lower reaches through the Red River Valley, portions of its course have been straightened and channelized.

Tributaries
The Wild Rice River's largest tributaries are the White Earth River, which joins it near Mahnomen, and the South Branch Wild Rice River, which joins it in its lower course in Norman County; the South Branch rises near Ogema in northwestern Becker County and flows  generally westwardly through Clay and Norman counties, past the town of Ulen.

See also
List of Minnesota rivers
List of longest streams of Minnesota

References

 Waters, Thomas F. (1977).  The Streams and Rivers of Minnesota.  Minneapolis: University of Minnesota Press.  .

Rivers of Clearwater County, Minnesota
Rivers of Mahnomen County, Minnesota
Rivers of Norman County, Minnesota
Rivers of Minnesota
Tributaries of the Red River of the North
Rivers of Clay County, Minnesota
Rivers of Becker County, Minnesota